Narosodes punctana is a moth of the family Erebidae. It was described by Francis Walker in 1863. It is found in Sri Lanka and India and on Borneo.

Description
Its wingspan is 16 mm. In the male, the head and thorax are ochreous. Forewings are reddish brown except for the margins. The margins are ochreous. A raised dark scale tuft can be found at end of cell. Few scales are scattered near vein 1. Some small black specks can be found at apex. Abdomen and hindwings are pale ochreous.

Ecology
The habitat consists of lowland dipterocarp forests, secondary and coastal forests, as well as dry heath forests.

References

 

Nudariina
Moths described in 1863